The Palometa River (Spanish, Riacho Palometa, or variant name Río Palometa) is a river of Chaco Province, Argentina. It is a tributary of the Paraná Miní River.

See also
List of rivers of Argentina

References

 Rand McNally, The New International Atlas, 1993.

Rivers of Argentina
Rivers of Chaco Province